The following is an incomplete list of paintings and drawings by the Early Netherlandish painter Hugo van der Goes. Attribution of his work has been difficult for art historians, and a great many works though, in the early to mid-20th century, to be by his hand are now accepted to be copies by members of his workshop or by followers. Often, when trying to establish attribution, if there was no documentary evidence, comparisons were made to his great 1470 Portinari Altarpiece, mentioned by Vasari.

Hugo appears to have left many drawings, and either from these or the paintings themselves followers made many copies of compositions that have not survived from his own hand.

Works

Paintings

Drawings

Workshop

References

Sources
 Campbell, Lorne. The Fifteenth-Century Netherlandish Paintings. London, National Gallery. New Haven: Yale University Press, 1998. 

Goes, Hugo van der